Scythris autochlorella is a moth of the family Scythrididae. It was described by Pierre Viette in 1956. It is found in Madagascar.

References

autochlorella
Moths described in 1956